Milan is an Indian drama television series which aired on Sony TV, starring Rohit Roy and Nattasha Singh.

Overview
The story revolves around the life of a girl, Chanchal who is caught between family ties and her love.

Cast
 Mouli Ganguly
 Nattasha Singh as Chanchal 
 Rohit Roy as Ranbir Kapoor
 Karan Oberoi
 Gauri Karnik
 Navin Nischol
 Arun Bali
 Nandita Puri
 Rana Jung Bahadur
 Amrit Pal

References

Sony Entertainment Television original programming
Indian drama television series
Indian television soap operas
2000 Indian television series debuts
2001 Indian television series endings